, also known as  or simply shichimi, is a common Japanese spice mixture containing seven ingredients. Tōgarashi is the Japanese name for Capsicum annuum, a red pepper native to Central and South America, and it is this ingredient that makes shichimi spicy.

About 
A typical blend may contain:
 coarsely ground red chili pepper (the main ingredient)
 ground sanshō ("Japanese pepper")
 roasted orange peel (Chenpi)
 black sesame seed
 white sesame seed
 hemp seed
 ground ginger
 nori or aonori (seaweed)
 poppy seed

Some recipes may substitute or supplement these with yuzu peel, rapeseed or shiso.

It is often consumed with soups and on noodles and gyūdon. Some rice products such as rice cakes, agemochi and roasted rice crackers also use it for seasoning.

History

Most shichimi sold today come from one of three kinds, sold near temples:  sold near Sensō-ji,  sold near Kiyomizu-dera, and  sold near Zenkō-ji.

Culture
In modern times, the product is generally sold as a formulated product, but in the past it was prepared and sold according to the customer's needs (七味唐辛子売り). Even today, performances can be seen at festival stalls.

See also
 List of condiments

References

Herb and spice mixtures
Japanese condiments